Nychos (born 1982) is an illustrator, urban artist and graffiti artist from Austria. He is known for his characteristic dissection, cross-section, x-ray and translucent styles, often portraying animals and characters drawn from pop culture. 

His works can be seen on walls around the world while his works on canvas and drawing have been shown in internationally in galleries. In 2015 the artist released the documentary “The Deepest Depths of the Burrow”, which depicts his experiences as a globetrotter artist. 

Nychos' pseudonym originates from dinosaurs named “Deinonychus”. The name means “terrible claw” in Latin.

Early career

Born into a family of hunters in Bruck an der Mur, Styria, Austria, Nychos was fascinated by the anatomical details resulting from the exercise of hunting from an early age. At age 14, Nychos had already decided he wanted to become a comic artist and character designer. At 17, Nychos learned of street art culture and the use of spray cans—a practice which allowed for the addition of color to his then black and white cartoons while demanding for quicker and more spontaneous works. As a result of his family's hunting activities, motifs of dissection started to appear in his works around 2011, with some aspects of it already evident in works from previous years. The work "Fur Skin Skeleton" is considered the first to bare such style, according to the artist. Later in his career, the artist also started to portray cross-sections in his work.

Style and influence
Nychos defines his work as a fusion of graffiti, heavy metal, cartoons and anatomy. In most of his works on canvas and murals the main characters are depicted dissected, transparent or melting with their insides on display.

The latest style that has surfaced is the use of translucency to create an x-ray effect in his works. After years experimenting with the effect of “cuts”, the artist evolved to find new compositions that would represent the insides of his characters.  Working with these new styles allowed the artist to add more details in each layer, achieving more realistic results.

Murals
Nychos distinguishes himself from most graffiti artists for his spontaneous creative process. He does not rely on the support of projection to create his walls and only uses sketches during the creation of murals.

Nychos is known for the speed in which he paints his large murals. His biggest mural to date, titled "Translucent Serpent," was completed in August 2016 for the Mural Harbor Street Art Project.

Solo exhibitions

 2015: Translucent Fear, Kolly Gallery, Zürich, Switzerland
 2016: IKON, Jonathan Levine Gallery, New York City
 2017: Monochrome Organism, Juddy Roller, Melbourne, Australia
 2018: Endless Layers Till Consciousness, Mirus Gallery, San Francisco, USA

References 

Austrian artists
Street artists
People from Bruck an der Mur
1982 births
Living people